Lloyd Wood is a British theatre and opera director working in the UK and internationally.

Career
After studying at Cambridge University and at University College London, Wood worked as an assistant director at the Royal Court Theatre and the Gate Theatre alongside Ian Rickson, Marianne Elliott (Director), Ramin Gray and Alan Rickman.  Subsequently he became Associate Director at the Theatre Royal Haymarket and the Gate Theatre.

He was nominated as Best Newcomer in the International Opera Awards 2017.

His previous productions include Don Giovanni with English Touring Opera and IMPOSSIBLE, an international magic show seen, originally, in London's Noel Coward Theatre in 2015.

Companies worked with

Glyndebourne Festival Opera
Mariinsky Theatre
English Touring Opera
Jamie Hendry Productions
Sonia Friedman Productions
Theatre Royal Haymarket
Royal Court Theatre
Houston Symphony
Canadian Opera Company
Chichester Festival Theatre
Edinburgh International Festival
The Royal Opera, Covent Garden
Lyric Opera of Chicago
Gate Theatre

References

External links
Personal Website

British opera directors
British theatre directors

1980 births
Living people
Place of birth missing (living people)